Clément Michu (1936–2016) was a French film and television actor.

Early life
Clément Michu was born on 27 November 1936 in Villeurbanne in the Metropolis of Lyon.

Career
Michu acted in many films, four of which were directed by Gérard Oury. He acted also on Thierry la Fronde, a television programme, from 1963 to 1966. His best-known role was as Inspector Guyomard on Commissaire Moulin, a series on TF1, from 1980 to 2008.

Personal life and death
Michu resided in Nogent-sur-Marne near Paris, where he died on 21 October 2016. He was 79 years old.

Filmography

References

External links

1936 births
2016 deaths
People from Villeurbanne
People from Nogent-sur-Marne
20th-century French male actors
21st-century French male actors
French male television actors